The 2005 Pittsburgh Pirates season was the 124th season of the franchise; the 119th in the National League. This was their fifth season at PNC Park. The Pirates finished sixth and last in the National League Central with a record of 67–95.

Offseason
November 2, 2004: Jorge Velandia was signed as a free agent with the Pittsburgh Pirates.
November 27, 2004: Jason Kendall was traded by the Pittsburgh Pirates with cash to the Oakland Athletics for Mark Redman, Arthur Rhodes, and cash.

Regular season

Season standings

Game log

|- style="background:#fbb;"
| 1 || April 4 || Brewers || 2–9 || Sheets || Pérez (0–1) || — || 38,016 || 0–1
|- style="background:#fbb;"
| 2 || April 6 || Brewers || 2–10 || Davis || Wells (0–1) || — || 12,077 || 0–2
|- style="background:#fbb;"
| 3 || April 7 || @ Padres || 0–1 (12) || Seanez || White (0–1) || — || 43,538 || 0–3
|- style="background:#cfc;"
| 4 || April 8 || @ Padres || 3–2 || Fogg (1–0) || Lawrence || Mesa (1) || 39,791 || 1–3
|- style="background:#fbb;"
| 5 || April 9 || @ Padres || 3–11 || Williams || Pérez (0–2) || — || 37,939 || 1–4
|- style="background:#cfc;"
| 6 || April 10 || @ Padres || 6–3 || Williams (1–0) || Redding || Mesa (2) || 33,521 || 2–4
|- style="background:#fbb;"
| 7 || April 11 || @ Brewers || 2–6 || Davis || Wells (0–2) || — || 42,458 || 2–5
|- style="background:#cfc;"
| 8 || April 12 || @ Brewers || 4–2 || Redman (1–0) || Glover || Mesa (3) || 10,927 || 3–5
|- style="background:#fbb;"
| 9 || April 13 || @ Brewers || 2–6 || De La Rosa || White (0–2) || — || 11,021 || 3–6
|- style="background:#cfc;"
| 10 || April 15 || Cubs || 8–5 || Torres (1–0) || Remlinger || Mesa (4) || 29,256 || 4–6
|- style="background:#fbb;"
| 11 || April 16 || Cubs || 3–4 || Dempster || Wells (0–3) || Hawkins || 34,783 || 4–7
|- style="background:#fbb;"
| 12 || April 17 || Cubs || 2–4 || Wuertz || Redman (1–1) || Hawkins || 20,416 || 4–8
|- style="background:#fbb;"
| 13 || April 18 || Cardinals || 1–11 || Mulder || Williams (1–1) || — || 11,220 || 4–9
|- style="background:#fbb;"
| 14 || April 19 || Cardinals || 1–7 || Morris || Fogg (1–1) || — || 12,285 || 4–10
|- style="background:#fbb;"
| 15 || April 20 || @ Reds || 4–6 || Wilson || Torres (1–1) || Graves || 16,857 || 4–11
|- style="background:#cfc;"
| 16 || April 21 || @ Reds || 4–2 || Wells (1–3) || Milton || Mesa (5) || 16,218 || 5–11
|- style="background:#cfc;"
| 17 || April 23 || @ Cubs || 4–3 || Grabow (1–0) || Hawkins || Mesa (6) || 37,695 || 6–11
|- style="background:#fbb;"
| 18 || April 24 || @ Cubs || 2–5 || Wood || Williams (1–2) || Fox || 37,452 || 6–12
|- style="background:#cfc;"
| 19 || April 25 || Astros || 2–0 || Pérez (1–2) || Oswalt || Mesa (7) || 8,413 || 7–12
|- style="background:#cfc;"
| 20 || April 27 || Astros || 2–0 || Wells (2–3) || Pettitte || Mesa (8) || 13,426 || 8–12
|- style="background:#fbb;"
| 21 || April 29 || Giants || 2–3 || Tomko || Redman (1–2) || — || 24,209 || 8–13
|- style="background:#fbb;"
| 22 || April 30 || Giants || 6–7 || Walker || Williams (1–3) || Brower || 23,972 || 8–14
|-

|- style="background:#fbb;"
| 23 || May 1 || Giants || 3–8 || Hennessey || Pérez (1–3) || — || 22,100 || 8–15
|- style="background:#fbb;"
| 24 || May 2 || @ Astros || 4–11 || Pettitte || Fogg (1–2) || — || 23,882 || 8–16
|- style="background:#cfc;"
| 25 || May 3 || @ Astros || 7–4 || White (1–2) || Qualls || Mesa (9) || 27,809 || 9–16
|- style="background:#cfc;"
| 26 || May 4 || @ Astros || 6–4 || Torres (2–1) || Lidge || Mesa (10) || 29,299 || 10–16
|- style="background:#cfc;"
| 27 || May 5 || @ Diamondbacks || 6–2 || Williams (2–3) || Estes || — || 18,906 || 11–16
|- style="background:#fbb;"
| 28 || May 6 || @ Diamondbacks || 4–8 || Vazquez || Pérez (1–4) || — || 24,056 || 11–17
|- style="background:#cfc;"
| 29 || May 7 || @ Diamondbacks || 3–2 || Fogg (2–2) || Ortiz || Mesa (11) || 32,879 || 12–17
|- style="background:#cfc;"
| 30 || May 8 || @ Diamondbacks || 16–2 || Wells (3–3) || Halsey || — || 24,526 || 13–17
|- style="background:#fbb;"
| 31 || May 9 || @ Giants || 1–2 || Tomko || Redman (1–3) || — || 34,037 || 13–18
|- style="background:#cfc;"
| 32 || May 10 || @ Giants || 5–2 || Williams (3–3) || Brower || Mesa (12) || 35,668 || 14–18
|- style="background:#cfc;"
| 33 || May 11 || @ Giants || 7–2 || Fogg (3–2) || Lowry || White (1) || 39,200 || 15–18
|- style="background:#fbb;"
| 34 || May 13 || Brewers || 3–4 || Capuano || Mesa (0–1) || Turnbow || 23,845 || 15–19
|- style="background:#cfc;"
| 35 || May 14 || Brewers || 2–0 || Redman (2–3) || Santos || — || 21,772 || 16–19
|- style="background:#cfc;"
| 36 || May 15 || Brewers || 4–2 || Williams (4–3) || Glover || Mesa (13) || 15,134 || 17–19
|- style="background:#fbb;"
| 37 || May 17 || Cubs || 3–4 || Ohman || Mesa (0–2) || Dempster || 19,701 || 17–20
|- style="background:#fbb;"
| 38 || May 18 || Cubs || 2–3 || Wuertz || Mesa (0–3) || Dempster || 21,142 || 17–21
|- style="background:#cfc;"
| 39 || May 20 || Rockies || 9–4 || Redman (3–3) || Wright || — || 31,656 || 18–21
|- style="background:#cfc;"
| 40 || May 21 || Rockies || 8–3 || Pérez (2–4) || Jennings || Gonzalez (1) || 37,504 || 19–21
|- style="background:#fbb;"
| 41 || May 22 || Rockies || 3–4 || Kennedy || Fogg (3–3) || Fuentes || 20,853 || 19–22
|- style="background:#fbb;"
| 42 || May 23 || @ Cardinals || 2–4 || Carpenter || Williams (4–4) || Isringhausen || 33,073 || 19–23
|- style="background:#fbb;"
| 43 || May 24 || @ Cardinals || 1–2 (12) || Reyes || Mesa (0–4) || — || 36,285 || 19–24
|- style="background:#fbb;"
| 44 || May 25 || @ Cardinals || 5–11 || Mulder || Redman (3–4) || — || 34,895 || 19–25
|- style="background:#cfc;"
| 45 || May 26 || @ Reds || 8–4 || Pérez (3–4) || Ramirez || — || 20,513 || 20–25
|- style="background:#fbb;"
| 46 || May 27 || @ Reds || 5–6 || Wagner || Gonzalez (0–1) || — || 24,370 || 20–26
|- style="background:#cfc;"
| 47 || May 28 || @ Reds || 9–2 || Williams (5–4) || Milton || — || 30,739 || 21–26
|- style="background:#fbb;"
| 48 || May 29 || @ Reds || 2–11 || Claussen || Wells (3–4) || — || 26,107 || 21–27
|- style="background:#cfc;"
| 49 || May 30 || Marlins || 3–2 (10) || White (2–2) || Jones || — || 17,379 || 22–27
|- style="background:#cfc;"
| 50 || May 31 || Marlins || 5–4 || Meadows (1–0) || Bump || Mesa (14) || 12,553 || 23–27
|-

|- style="background:#cfc;"
| 51 || June 1 || Marlins || 9–1 || Fogg (4–3) || Moehler || Torres (1) || 15,487 || 24–27
|- style="background:#fbb;"
| 52 || June 2 || Marlins || 3–6 || Willis || Williams (5–5) || Jones || 15,105 || 24–28
|- style="background:#cfc;"
| 53 || June 3 || Braves || 3–1 || Wells (4–4) || Hudson || Mesa (15) || 27,643 || 25–28
|- style="background:#fbb;"
| 54 || June 4 || Braves || 0–1 || Foster || Gonzalez (0–2) || Reitsma || 33,649 || 25–29
|- style="background:#cfc;"
| 55 || June 5 || Braves || 5–2 || Pérez (4–4) || Bernero || Mesa (16) || 28,717 || 26–29
|- style="background:#fbb;"
| 56 || June 6 || Orioles || 3–4 || Julio || Torres (2–2) || Ryan || 15,860 || 26–30
|- style="background:#cfc;"
| 57 || June 7 || Orioles || 6–5 || Meadows (2–0) || Julio || Mesa (17) || 21,422 || 27–30
|- style="background:#cfc;"
| 58 || June 8 || Orioles || 6–1 || Wells (5–4) || Chen || — || 37,438 || 28–30
|- style="background:#cfc;"
| 59 || June 10 || Devil Rays || 7–2 || Redman (4–4) || Nomo || — || 27,517 || 29–30
|- style="background:#cfc;"
| 60 || June 11 || Devil Rays || 18–2 || Pérez (5–4) || Kazmir || — || 31,113 || 30–30
|- style="background:#fbb;"
| 61 || June 12 || Devil Rays || 5–7 (13) || Nunez || Meadows (2–1) || Orvella || 23,240 || 30–31
|- style="background:#fbb;"
| 62 || June 14 || @ Yankees || 0–9 || Mussina || Wells (5–5) || — || 44,541 || 30–32
|- style="background:#fbb;"
| 63 || June 15 || @ Yankees || 5–7 (10) || Rivera || Mesa (0–5) || — || 48,828 || 30–33
|- style="background:#fbb;"
| 64 || June 16 || @ Yankees || 1–6 || Johnson || Pérez (5–5) || — || 54,734 || 30–34
|- style="background:#fbb;"
| 65 || June 17 || @ Red Sox || 5–6 || Foulke || White (2–3) || — || 35,377 || 30–35
|- style="background:#cfc;"
| 66 || June 18 || @ Red Sox || 2–0 || White (3–3) || Embree || Mesa (18) || 35,216 || 31–35
|- style="background:#fbb;"
| 67 || June 19 || @ Red Sox || 0–8 || Clement || Wells (5–6) || — || 35,046 || 31–36
|- style="background:#fbb;"
| 68 || June 20 || Nationals || 4–7 || Hernandez || Redman (4–5) || Cordero || 21,893 || 31–37
|- style="background:#cfc;"
| 69 || June 21 || Nationals || 11–4 || Pérez (6–5) || Drese || — || 26,006 || 32–37
|- style="background:#fbb;"
| 70 || June 22 || Nationals || 4–5 || Carrasco || Gonzalez (0–3) || Cordero || 24,064 || 32–38
|- style="background:#cfc;"
| 71 || June 23 || @ Cardinals || 11–7 || Williams (6–5) || Morris || White (2) || 43,590 || 33–38
|- style="background:#fbb;"
| 72 || June 24 || @ Cardinals || 1–8 || Suppan || Wells (5–7) || — || 48,184 || 33–39
|- style="background:#fbb;"
| 73 || June 25 || @ Cardinals || 0–8 || Carpenter || Redman (4–6) || — || 48,413 || 33–40
|- style="background:#cfc;"
| 74 || June 26 || @ Cardinals || 5–4 (10) || Grabow (2–0) || Reyes || Mesa (19) || 45,050 || 34–40
|- style="background:#fbb;"
| 75 || June 28 || @ Nationals || 1–2 || Drese || Fogg (4–4) || Cordero || 35,828 || 34–41
|- style="background:#fbb;"
| 76 || June 29 || @ Nationals || 2–3 || Ayala || Torres (2–3) || Cordero || 31,213 || 34–42
|- style="background:#fbb;"
| 77 || June 30 || @ Nationals || 5–7 || Loaiza || Wells (5–8) || Cordero || 37,361 || 34–43
|-

|- style="background:#fbb;"
| 78 || July 1 || @ Brewers || 4–8 || Wise || Redman (4–7) || — || 21,804 || 34–44
|- style="background:#fbb;"
| 79 || July 2 || @ Brewers || 3–5 || Bottalico || Torres (2–4) || Turnbow || 29,052 || 34–45
|- style="background:#cfc;"
| 80 || July 3 || @ Brewers || 11–10 || Meadows (3–1) || Phelps || Mesa (20) || 28,323 || 35–45
|- style="background:#fbb;"
| 81 || July 4 || Phillies || 1–12 || Lidle || Williams (6–6) || — || 37,259 || 35–46
|- style="background:#cfc;"
| 82 || July 5 || Phillies || 3–0 || Wells (6–8) || Madson || — || 13,442 || 36–46
|- style="background:#fbb;"
| 83 || July 6 || Phillies || 0–5 || Padilla || Redman (4–8) || — || 19,961 || 36–47
|- style="background:#cfc;"
| 84 || July 7 || Phillies || 2–1 || Duke (1–0) || Myers || Mesa (21) || 20,942 || 37–47
|- style="background:#cfc;"
| 85 || July 8 || Mets || 6–5 (10) || Mesa (1–5) || Looper || — || 32,563 || 38–47
|- style="background:#cfc;"
| 86 || July 9 || Mets || 11–4 || Williams (7–6) || Ishii || — || 36,708 || 39–47
|- style="background:#fbb;"
| 87 || July 10 || Mets || 1–6 || Martinez || Wells (6–9) || — || 26,551 || 39–48
|- style="background:#fbb;"
| 88 || July 14 || @ Cubs || 1–5 || Prior || Redman (4–9) || — || 38,902 || 39–49
|- style="background:#fbb;"
| 89 || July 15 || @ Cubs || 1–11 || Wood || Fogg (4–5) || — || 39,512 || 39–50
|- style="background:#cfc;"
| 90 || July 16 || @ Cubs || 3–0 || Duke (2–0) || Maddux || Mesa (22) || 39,790 || 40–50
|- style="background:#fbb;"
| 91 || July 17 || @ Cubs || 2–8 || Zambrano || Wells (6–10) || — || 39,391 || 40–51
|- style="background:#fbb;"
| 92 || July 18 || Astros || 1–11 || Backe || Williams (7–7) || — || 17,590 || 40–52
|- style="background:#fbb;"
| 93 || July 19 || Astros || 3–9 || Astacio || Snell (0–1) || — || — || 40–53
|- style="background:#fbb;"
| 94 || July 19 || Astros || 4–6 || Rodriguez || Redman (4–10) || Lidge || 20,552 || 40–54
|- style="background:#fbb;"
| 95 || July 20 || Astros || 0–8 || Pettitte || Fogg (4–6) || — || 19,769 || 40–55
|- style="background:#cfc;"
| 96 || July 21 || Rockies || 8–1 || Duke (3–0) || Francis || — || 22,492 || 41–55
|- style="background:#fbb;"
| 97 || July 22 || Rockies || 3–5 (10) || Fuentes || Mesa (1–6) || Cortes || 35,262 || 41–56
|- style="background:#cfc;"
| 98 || July 23 || Rockies || 5–3 || Williams (8–7) || Kim || Mesa (23) || 37,778 || 42–56
|- style="background:#cfc;"
| 99 || July 24 || Rockies || 3–0 || Redman (5–10) || Chacon || Mesa (24) || 18,523 || 43–56
|- style="background:#cfc;"
| 100 || July 26 || @ Marlins || 6–3 || Fogg (5–6) || Moehler || Mesa (25) || 26,431 || 44–56
|- style="background:#fbb;"
| 101 || July 27 || @ Marlins || 1–3 || Vargas || Vogelsong (0–1) || Jones || 21,216 || 44–57
|- style="background:#fbb;"
| 102 || July 28 || @ Marlins || 0–3 || Willis || Wells (6–11) || Jones || 19,621 || 44–58
|- style="background:#fbb;"
| 103 || July 29 || @ Braves || 1–2 || Ramirez || Williams (8–8) || McBride || 36,767 || 44–59
|- style="background:#fbb;"
| 104 || July 30 || @ Braves || 6–9 || Davies || Redman (5–11) || Reitsma || 47,441 || 44–60
|- style="background:#fbb;"
| 105 || July 31 || @ Braves || 4–5 || Smoltz || Grabow (2–1) || Reitsma || 33,275 || 44–61
|-

|- style="background:#cfc;"
| 106 || August 1 || @ Braves || 4–1 || Duke (4–0) || Hudson || Mesa (26) || 25,875 || 45–61
|- style="background:#fbb;"
| 107 || August 2 || Padres || 3–11 || Peavy || Wells (6–12) || — || 23,624 || 45–62
|- style="background:#cfc;"
| 108 || August 3 || Padres || 9–8 || Mesa (2–6) || Otsuka || — || 23,274 || 46–62
|- style="background:#fbb;"
| 109 || August 4 || Padres || 7–12 || Lawrence || Redman (5–12) || — || 21,739 || 46–63
|- style="background:#fbb;"
| 110 || August 5 || Dodgers || 6–12 || Lowe || Fogg (5–7) || Schmoll || 37,318 || 46–64
|- style="background:#cfc;"
| 111 || August 6 || Dodgers || 9–4 || Duke (5–0) || Perez || — || 38,579 || 47–64
|- style="background:#fbb;"
| 112 || August 7 || Dodgers || 4–6 || Weaver || Snell (0–2) || Schmoll || 25,860 || 47–65
|- style="background:#cfc;"
| 113 || August 9 || @ Rockies || 12–4 || Williams (9–8) || Acevedo || — || 20,683 || 48–65
|- style="background:#fbb;"
| 114 || August 10 || @ Rockies || 5–6 (10) || Cortes || White (3–4) || — || 20,135 || 48–66
|- style="background:#cfc;"
| 115 || August 11 || @ Rockies || 11–3 || Fogg (6–7) || Francis || — || 21,102 || 49–66
|- style="background:#fbb;"
| 116 || August 12 || @ Astros || 5–6 || Wheeler || White (3–5) || Lidge || 37,524 || 49–67
|- style="background:#cfc;"
| 117 || August 13 || @ Astros || 1–0 || Torres (3–4) || Lidge || Mesa (27) || 43,286 || 50–67
|- style="background:#cfc;"
| 118 || August 14 || @ Astros || 8–0 || Williams (10–8) || Astacio || — || 36,872 || 51–67
|- style="background:#fbb;"
| 119 || August 16 || @ Mets || 2–6 || Benson || Redman (5–13) || — || 37,202 || 51–68
|- style="background:#fbb;"
| 120 || August 17 || @ Mets || 1–5 || Glavine || Fogg (6–8) || Heilman || 28,730 || 51–69
|- style="background:#cfc;"
| 121 || August 18 || @ Mets || 5–0 || Duke (6–0) || Zambrano || — || 35,653 || 52–69
|- style="background:#cfc;"
| 122 || August 19 || @ Phillies || 11–2 || Wells (7–12) || Tejeda || — || 32,992 || 53–69
|- style="background:#fbb;"
| 123 || August 20 || @ Phillies || 1–6 || Myers || Williams (10–9) || — || 43,192 || 53–70
|- style="background:#fbb;"
| 124 || August 21 || @ Phillies || 3–4 || Madson || White (3–6) || Wagner || 40,689 || 53–71
|- style="background:#fbb;"
| 125 || August 22 || Cardinals || 1–3 || Mulder || Fogg (6–9) || Isringhausen || 23,751 || 53–72
|- style="background:#cfc;"
| 126 || August 23 || Cardinals || 10–0 || Torres (4–4) || Marquis || — || 23,948 || 54–72
|- style="background:#fbb;"
| 127 || August 24 || Cardinals || 3–8 || Carpenter || Wells (7–13) || — || 21,506 || 54–73
|- style="background:#fbb;"
| 128 || August 25 || Cardinals || 3–6 || Morris || Williams (10–10) || Isringhausen || 24,626 || 54–74
|- style="background:#fbb;"
| 129 || August 26 || Reds || 1–6 || Harang || Redman (5–14) || — || 28,788 || 54–75
|- style="background:#fbb;"
| 130 || August 27 || Reds || 2–4 (10) || Weathers || Mesa (2–7) || Mercker || 23,109 || 54–76
|- style="background:#fbb;"
| 131 || August 28 || Reds || 2–7 || Hudson || Wells (7–14) || Coffey || 23,495 || 54–77
|- style="background:#cfc;"
| 132 || August 30 || @ Brewers || 6–0 || Maholm (1–0) || Davis || — || 28,337 || 55–77
|- style="background:#fbb;"
| 133 || August 31 || @ Brewers || 5–6 || Turnbow || Mesa (2–8) || — || 15,062 || 55–78
|-

|- style="background:#fbb;"
| 134 || September 2 || Cubs || 3–7 || Maddux || Fogg (6–10) || Dempster || 24,976 || 55–79
|- style="background:#fbb;"
| 135 || September 3 || Cubs || 5–9 || Zambrano || Williams (10–11) || — || 22,909 || 55–80
|- style="background:#fbb;"
| 136 || September 4 || Cubs || 0–2 || Williams || Wells (7–15) || Dempster || 23,204 || 55–81
|- style="background:#fbb;"
| 137 || September 6 || Diamondbacks || 2–4 (12) || Valverde || Grabow (2–2) || Groom || 11,186 || 55–82
|- style="background:#fbb;"
| 138 || September 7 || Diamondbacks || 2–4 || Webb || Redman (5–15) || Valverde || 12,066 || 55–83
|- style="background:#cfc;"
| 139 || September 8 || Diamondbacks || 8–7 (12) || White (4–6) || Groom || — || 10,984 || 56–83
|- style="background:#cfc;"
| 140 || September 9 || @ Reds || 8–4 || Vogelsong (1–1) || Hudson || — || 19,244 || 57–83
|- style="background:#fbb;"
| 141 || September 10 || @ Reds || 2–6 || Ortiz || Wells (7–16) || — || 23,510 || 57–84
|- style="background:#fbb;"
| 142 || September 11 || @ Reds || 3–5 || Belisle || Grabow (2–3) || Weathers || 18,529 || 57–85
|- style="background:#fbb;"
| 143 || September 12 || @ Cardinals || 3–4 || Isringhausen || Torres (4–5) || — || 40,064 || 57–86
|- style="background:#fbb;"
| 144 || September 13 || @ Cardinals || 4–5 || Thompson || White (4–7) || — || 40,599 || 57–87
|- style="background:#cfc;"
| 145 || September 14 || @ Cardinals || 5–3 || Vogelsong (2–1) || Marquis || Gonzalez (2) || 40,172 || 58–87
|- style="background:#fbb;"
| 146 || September 16 || Reds || 2–8 || Claussen || Duke (6–1) || — || — || 58–88
|- style="background:#cfc;"
| 147 || September 16 || Reds || 5–4 || Torres (5–5) || Weathers || — || 22,715 || 59–88
|- style="background:#cfc;"
| 148 || September 17 || Reds || 4–0 || Maholm (2–0) || Harang || — || 31,174 || 60–88
|- style="background:#cfc;"
| 149 || September 18 || Reds || 9–7 || Gonzalez (1–3) || Belisle || — || 21,320 || 61–88
|- style="background:#cfc;"
| 150 || September 19 || Astros || 7–0 || Snell (1–2) || Clemens || — || 13,865 || 62–88
|- style="background:#fbb;"
| 151 || September 20 || Astros || 4–7 || Pettitte || Gorzelanny (0–1) || — || 12,927 || 62–89
|- style="background:#fbb;"
| 152 || September 21 || Astros || 8–12 || Oswalt || Wells (7–17) || — || 16,266 || 62–90
|- style="background:#fbb;"
| 153 || September 22 || Astros || 1–2 || Backe || Duke (6–2) || Lidge || 12,587 || 62–91
|- style="background:#fbb;"
| 154 || September 23 || @ Dodgers || 3–4 || Houlton || Maholm (2–1) || Sanchez || 40,170 || 62–92
|- style="background:#cfc;"
| 155 || September 24 || @ Dodgers || 8–3 || Pérez (7–5) || Perez || — || 45,730 || 63–92
|- style="background:#fbb;"
| 156 || September 25 || @ Dodgers || 2–9 || Lowe || Fogg (6–11) || — || 37,846 || 63–93
|- style="background:#fbb;"
| 157 || September 26 || @ Dodgers || 4–9 || Jackson || Wells (7–18) || — || 36,397 || 63–94
|- style="background:#cfc;"
| 158 || September 27 || @ Cubs || 5–3 || Duke (7–2) || Maddux || Torres (2) || 38,440 || 64–94
|- style="background:#cfc;"
| 159 || September 28 || @ Cubs || 3–2 || Maholm (3–1) || Prior || Gonzalez (3) || 37,491 || 65–94
|- style="background:#fbb;"
| 160 || September 30 || Brewers || 5–6 || Lehr || Vogelsong (2–2) || Turnbow || 20,922 || 65–95
|-

|- style="background:#cfc;"
| 161 || October 1 || Brewers || 5–1 || Wells (8–18) || Ohka || — || 17,261 || 66–95
|- style="background:#cfc;"
| 162 || October 2 || Brewers || 3–1 || Duke (8–2) || Capuano || Torres (3) || 23,008 || 67–95
|-

|-
| Legend:       = Win       = LossBold = Pirates team member

Record vs. opponents

Detailed records

Roster

Opening Day lineup

Awards and honors
2005 Major League Baseball All-Star Game
Jason Bay, OF, reserve

Statistics
Hitting
Note: G = Games played; AB = At bats; H = Hits; Avg. = Batting average; HR = Home runs; RBI = Runs batted in

Pitching
Note: G = Games pitched; IP = Innings pitched; W = Wins; L = Losses; ERA = Earned run average; SO = Strikeouts

Farm system

References

 2005 Pittsburgh Pirates at Baseball Reference
 2005 Pittsburgh Pirates  at Baseball Almanac

Pittsburgh Pirates seasons
Pittsburgh Pirates Season, 2005
Pittsburgh Pirates Season, 2005
Pittsburgh Pirates